Rose Township may refer to the following places in the U.S. state of Michigan:

 Rose Township, Oakland County, Michigan
 Rose Township, Ogemaw County, Michigan

See also 
 Rose Lake Township, Michigan, in Osceola County
 Rose Township (disambiguation)

Michigan township disambiguation pages